Ricardo Falconi (born 21 November 1962) is a Chilean modern pentathlete. He competed at the 1988 Summer Olympics.

References

External links
 

1962 births
Living people
Chilean male modern pentathletes
Olympic modern pentathletes of Chile
Modern pentathletes at the 1988 Summer Olympics
20th-century Chilean people